Wickel is a surname. Notable people with the surname include:

Harrison Wickel (1912–1989), American baseball player, manager, and scout
Ralph James Wickel (1921–2001), American tennis player

See also
Mickel